Chondrolepis is a genus of skippers in the family Hesperiidae.

Species
Chondrolepis cynthia Evans, 1936
Chondrolepis ducarmei T.B. Larsen & Congdon, 2012
Chondrolepis leggei (Heron, 1909)
Chondrolepis nero Evans, 1937
Chondrolepis niveicornis (Plötz, 1883)
Chondrolepis obscurior de Jong, 1986
Chondrolepis similis de Jong, 1986
Chondrolepis telisignata (Butler, 1896)
Chondrolepis uluguru T.B. Larsen & Congdon, 2012

References

External links
Natural History Museum Lepidoptera genus database
Seitz, A. Die Gross-Schmetterlinge der Erde 13: Die Afrikanischen Tagfalter. Plate XIII 78

Hesperiinae
Hesperiidae genera